Aleksandar Lazevski (born 21 January 1988) is a retired Macedonian footballer.

Club career
Lazevski has passed Partizan's youth academy after which he was transferred to FK Teleoptik to gain experience. Lazevski was promoted to Partizan during the 2007–08 season, where he scored a goal on his debut. Because of injury problems he lost a place in the first team and was transferred to Teleoptik once again. In January 2010, after good performances in Teleoptik, he returned to Partizan. Lazevski won with Partizan four Serbian championship titles, and one Serbian Cup. He also made appearances in the 2009–10 UEFA Europa League group stage and the 2010–11 UEFA Champions League group stage.

International career
On 3 September, in 2010, Lazevski made his international debut for Macedonia in a UEFA Euro 2012 qualifier against Slovakia in Bratislava. He has earned a total of 14 caps. His final international was a September 2013 FIFA World Cup qualification match against Wales.

Career statistics

Honours
Partizan
 Serbian SuperLiga (6): 2007–08, 2008–09, 2009–10, 2010–11, 2011–12, 2012–13
 Serbian Cup (3): 2007–08, 2008–09, 2010–11

References

External links
 
 Aleksandar Lazevski's video highlights at vimeo.com 
 Aleksandar Lazevski at utakmica.rs 
 Aleksandar Lazevski at macedonianfootball.com 

1988 births
Living people
People from Vršac
Macedonians of Serbia
Serbian people of Macedonian descent
Macedonian people of Serbian descent
Association football fullbacks
Macedonian footballers
North Macedonia under-21 international footballers
North Macedonia international footballers
FK Teleoptik players
FK Partizan players
FC Hoverla Uzhhorod players
FK Rad players
NK Olimpija Ljubljana (2005) players
FK Mladost Lučani players
FK Sloboda Tuzla players
Serbian SuperLiga players
Serbian First League players
Ukrainian Premier League players
Slovenian PrvaLiga players
Premier League of Bosnia and Herzegovina players
Macedonian expatriate footballers
Expatriate footballers in Ukraine
Macedonian expatriate sportspeople in Ukraine
Expatriate footballers in Slovenia
Macedonian expatriate sportspeople in Slovenia
Expatriate footballers in Bosnia and Herzegovina
Macedonian expatriate sportspeople in Bosnia and Herzegovina